Rashod is a given name. Notable people with the given name include:

Rashod Bateman (born 1999), American football player
Rashod Berry (born 1996), American football player
Rashod Hill (born 1992), American football player
Rashod Kent (born 1980), American athlete
Rashod Moulton (born 1981), American football player
Rashod Swinger (born 1974), American football player

See also
Rashad